Barbara Albert (born 1970 in Vienna) is an Austrian writer, film-producer and film-director.

She studied filmmaking at the Wiener Filmakademie. Her first film to become known to a larger audience was Nordrand, which describes the reality of life of Yugoslavian children in Vienna.

She heads the production company Coop 99 with Jessica Hausner and Antonin Svoboda, among others.

Filmography
2017 Mademoiselle Paradis
2006 Fallen
2003 Free Radicals
2001 Zur Lage
1999 Nordrand
1998 Somewhere else
1998 Slidin‘ – alles bunt und wunderbar
1998 Sonnenflecken
1993 Die Frucht deines Leibes
1993 Nachtschwalben

Prizes
"Marcello Mastroianni Award" (Best Young Actress) Venedig 1999
Wiener Filmpreis
Preis der FIPRESCI Jury (Viennale)
Best Feature Film (Stockholm)

External links

1970 births
Living people
Writers from Vienna
Austrian women writers
Austrian screenwriters
Austrian film directors
Austrian women film directors